The Indiana Subdivision is a railroad line owned and operated by CSX Transportation in the U.S. states of Ohio and Indiana. The line runs from Cincinnati, Ohio, west to Washington, Indiana, along a former Baltimore and Ohio Railroad line.

At its east end, the Indiana Subdivision becomes the Cincinnati Terminal Subdivision; it continues west as the Illinois Subdivision. Along the way, the line intersects the Hoosier Subdivision at Mitchell, Indiana.

History
The line, built by the Ohio and Mississippi Railroad, was completed in 1857. It passed to the Baltimore and Ohio Railroad and CSX via leases and mergers.

References

CSX Transportation lines
Rail infrastructure in Ohio
Rail infrastructure in Indiana
Baltimore and Ohio Railroad lines